Deborah Washington Brown (June 3, 1952 - June 5, 2020) was an American computer scientist and speech recognition researcher who worked at AT&T Bell Labs, and other companies for many years doing speech recognition research. She was the first black woman to earn a doctorate in computer science (then a part of their applied math program) at Harvard University in 1981. She was one of the first black female computer scientists to graduate from a U. S. doctoral program.

Early life and education
Born as Deborah Blanche Washington on June 3, 1952, in Washington D. C., Brown was the youngest of 4 children (with a twin brother Melvin Charles Washington) of Edwin and Lola Washington.  She attended high school at the National Cathedral School 1966–70. She was admitted to the New England Conservatory of Music in 1970 to pursue her dream of becoming a classical pianist, but left in 1971 for Lowell Technological Institute after being dissuaded about her prospects. She received a bachelor's degree with honors in mathematics at Lowell in 1975. She received a Master's (1977) and a PhD (1981) in Applied Math at Harvard University advised first by Harry R. Lewis and then by Tom Cheatham.  Her thesis was on “The solution of difference equations describing array manipulation in program loops”. She was elected Commencement marshal at her Harvard graduation.

Computer science career

Brown's first job was at Norden Systems, developing software for missile defense technology.  In the late 1980s, she joined AT&T Bell Labs as a Member of Technical Staff and later Principal Member of Technical Staff. Her speech technology career continued at other companies until her death in 2020.

Brown worked at the forefront of many applications of speech recognition during her career, and her contributions to the field are  seen in part through her 11 United States Patents on which she is a named inventor.  These include data collection methods using automatic speech recognition (ASR) instead of human agents, methods for correcting ASR errors in user id recognition (numbers or names) over the phone using confusion matrices, innovations in grammar generation and pruning for ASR, 
methods for identifying prompt-specific caller responses, multiple methods to identify errors in recognition of user account numbers due to ASR issues using confusion matrices of possible answers, a Natural Language Call Router, and a system to bridge text chat interaction with a voice-enabled interactive voice response system.

Personal life 
In addition to her technological achievements, Brown was also an accomplished classical pianist.  Throughout her career in computer science, Brown continued to study and teach piano, playing at Carnegie Hall and excelling in competitions.

Brown married Ruel “Rula” Brown on May 26, 1979. They have two daughters.

See also 
 Women in computing

References

External links 
 Harvard University Alumni Profile
 Harvard University Doctoral Dissertation with Historical Note
 Obituary and piano performance segments
 Obituary

1952 births
2020 deaths
20th-century American engineers
21st-century American engineers
20th-century American inventors
20th-century American scientists
21st-century American scientists
20th-century American women scientists
21st-century American women scientists
American computer scientists
American women computer scientists
Harvard University alumni
Women inventors